Alexander Borisovich Mindlin (14 May 1929 – 11 October 2019) was a Russian engineer and author.

Biography
Mindlin was born in 1929 in Leningrad. He survived the Siege of Leningrad, undertaken by the Nazi German Army. In 1951 he graduated from the Leningrad Electrotechnical Institute. For 44 years, he worked in various factories and scientific research institutes. He developed and manufactured electrical systems and products. He had published about thirty papers and three monographs on the specialty and received eight invention certificates. In 1968 he moved permanently from Leningrad to Moscow. In 1996, after retiring he became a full-time historian of Russian Jews (1762-1917). He had published 15 articles and two books on the subject, as well as an autobiographical book "My life in the USSR" (Russian: "Время совка").

Books in Russian 
 State, political and public figures of the Russian Empire in the fate of the Jews, 1762-1917: A Guide to persons / Alexander Mindlin .- St. Petersburg: Aletheia, 2007 - 391 p.; 21 cm. - (Leviathan: The State. Society. Personality). - Index . - Bibliography .: p. 360-381 .- .
 My life in the USSR (Russian: "Время совка") / A.B. Mindlin .- Moscow, 2008 - 391 p. 20 cm.
 State Duma and the Jewish question / Alexander Mindlin. - St. Petersburg: Aletheia, 2014. - 487 p. : Ill. ; 21 cm. - (History Book) .- Bibliography: p. 449-467. - Index: p. 468-485. - 1000 copies. -

Articles in Russian
Pyotr Stolypin "Jewish policy" // The Society "Jewish heritage". A series of preprints. Vol. 19. M. 1996.

The Jewish question and financial relations between Russia and the West in the late 19th - early 20th century // the Bulletin of the Jewish University in Moscow. 1996. No.2 (12). pp. 81–103.

The Russian public and the problem of Jewish equality in the early 20th century // The Society "Jewish heritage". A series of preprints. Vol. 29.- M. 1997.

A.A. Lopuhin, S.D. Urusov and anti-Semitism // The Society "Jewish heritage". A series of preprints. Vol. 30.- M. 1997.

The activities of committees, commissions and meetings on Jewish reforms in Russia in the 19th - early 20th century // "Questions of history". 2000. No. 8. pp. 43–61.<

Russian Jews in the projects of "Joint nobility" // "Issues of history". 2002. No.4. pp. 13–26.

References

External links
 Official website of the author

1929 births
2019 deaths
Engineers from Saint Petersburg
Writers from Saint Petersburg
Writers from Moscow
Saint Petersburg Electrotechnical University alumni
Engineers from Moscow